Real Snail Mail is a webmail service created by artists Vicky Isley and Paul Smith aka boredomresearch, which uses real live snails equipped with Radio Frequency Identification (RFID) tags to deliver electronic messages. The project was commissioned  as part of the Tagged Exhibition in Space Media Arts, London in 2006  and was developed during boredomresearchs’ research fellowship in the Computer Animation Research Centre at Bournemouth University. 

The installation version of Real Snail Mail was displayed at SIGGRAPH08 in Los Angeles (11–15 August 2008), at the British Science Festival (14–19 September 2009), and at [DAM]Berlin as part of boredomresearch’s solo exhibition, ‘Chasing Stillness’ (29 August - 24 October 2009).

How it works 

Each snail "agent" is fitted with a RFID tag on its shell.
Users of the service send a message via the Real Snail Mail website which is routed to the tank to await collection by a snail "agent".
As the snails wander around the tank, they come into range of a RFID reader, which assigns the e-mail message to the RFID tag.
The references to the electronic messages are then physically carried around the tank by the snails until one of them passes close to a second reader.
As soon as this happens, the second reader triggers the message to be forwarded over the net in the usual way.

External links 
 homepage of the project.
 homepage of the artists.
 project blog.

Further reading 
 Time Magazine
 Esquire
 BBC News

‘Chasing Stillness’, Foreword by Carl Honoré, [DAM] Berlin, 2009
 ‘Internetting every thing, everywhere, all the time’ CNN.com DigitalBiz article by Cherise Fong, 3 November 2008
 ‘Playing games without frontiers’ CNN.com DigitalBiz article by Cherise Fong, 3 October 2008

‘Vicky Isley of BoredomResearch.net, which has created what it calls Real Snail Mail’ The Bob Rivers Show Interview on 102.5 KZOK, 19 August 2008

BBC WorldServices Radio Interview, 7 August 2008
 Interview with BBC Newsround 23 July 2008, 5.00-5.15pm
 ‘The Wired Campus: Real Snail Mail’ The Chronicle of Higher Education, 26 June 2008
 ‘Real Snail Mail’ Slashdot, 24 June 2008
 ‘Real Snail Mail turns email into slower email’, Neural.it, 07 November 2017
 ‘Snail mail, brought to you by real snails’ The Inquirer, 20 June 2008
 ‘SIGGRAPH Galleries Explore Architecture, Art, Design & Computation’ SIGGRAPH Press Release by Brian Ban, 19 June 2008
 ‘Snail (And We Do Mean Snail) Mail’ Discovery News: Etherized Blog, 18 June 2008
 ‘Real Snail Mail’ New Scientist Technology Blog, 18 June 2008
 ‘Snail mail’ blazes slow e-trail BBC News, 17 June 2008
 ‘Slow Down, You’re Moving Too Fast’ RFID Journal article by Beth Bacheldor, 2006

References 

Interactive art